JIS X 0211, originally designated JIS C 6323 is a Japanese Industrial Standard defining C0 and C1 control codes and control sequences. It was first established in 1986, with subsequent editions in 1991 and 1994.

It defines C0 and C1 control characters for use with other JIS coded character sets, e.g. JIS X 0201 and JIS X 0208. It is a derivative of ISO/IEC 6429 (ECMA-48); however, it doesn't feature all control functions presently listed by ISO/IEC 6429. It is distinct from the now-withdrawn JIS X 0207 (JIS C 6225), an earlier JIS standard for control codes which was established in 1979, which used a different syntax for control sequences.

Codepage layout

References

ASH multimedia lab JIS X 0211 page
Imady's Homepage JIS X 0211 page
Text-only version of JIS X 0211:1994

Encodings of Japanese